Philip Rosenau (born 1946), is an Israeli mathematician and a poet. He is a professor at the Department of Applied Mathematics at Tel Aviv University. He introduced compactons, along with James M. Hyman.

References

20th-century Israeli mathematicians
21st-century Israeli mathematicians
Academic staff of Tel Aviv University
1946 births
Living people